Filodimos is a newspaper that was founded in 1886 in Aigio, Greece. The newspaper is the first publication ever established in the city.

See also
List of newspapers in Greece

References
The first version of the article is translated and is based from the article at the Greek Wikipedia (el:Main Page)

External links
Official Website

Greek-language newspapers
Mass media in Aigio
Publications established in 1886
1886 establishments in Greece
Weekly newspapers published in Greece

el:Φιλόδημος